The  is a botanical garden located at the eastern side of the Suigo-Tsukuba Quasi-National Park in Katori, Chiba, Japan. It is open 9 a.m.-4:30 p.m. (8 a.m.-7 p.m. during the Iris Festival) every day in May and June. July through April it is closed every Monday and from Dec.24 through Jan.4. Admission is charged. 

The garden opened in 1969 and features a wide assortment of aquatic plants. It is best known for its  iris and lotus collections, comprising about 1.5 million irises of 350 varieties, and more than 300 varieties of lotus. The irises are at their best in June, and the lotuses in August.

See also 
 List of botanical gardens in Japan

References 

 Suigō Sawara Aquatic Botanical Garden
 Japan Times article

Botanical gardens in Japan
Gardens in Chiba Prefecture
Katori, Chiba